2015 World Cup may refer to:
 2015 Cricket World Cup
 2014–15 Fencing World Cup
 2015 FIFA Women's World Cup, in association football
 2015 FIFA U-20 World Cup, in association football
 2015 IFAF World Championship, in American football
 2015 Rugby World Cup (rugby union)
 2015 FIVB Volleyball Women's World Cup
 2015 FIVB Volleyball Men's World Cup
 Chess World Cup 2015
 2015 Netball World Cup
 2015 World Cup (snooker)

See also
World Cup